Pandanti Kapuram is a 1972 Indian Telugu-language family drama film directed by Lakshmi Deepak. The film features an ensemble cast of Krishna, S. V. Ranga Rao, Vijaya Nirmala, Jamuna, B. Saroja Devi, Anjali Devi, Gummadi, Prabhakar Reddy. Released on July 21, 1972, Pandanti Kapuram was one of the biggest hits of the year. It is also the first film of Krishna to celebrate a silver jubilee (175 days) run at the box-office.

The film won the National Award for Best Feature Film in Telugu and the Filmfare Award for Best Film - Telugu. It was remade into the Hindi film Sunehra Sansar (1975) and in Tamil as Anbu Sagodharargal. Jayasudha made her screen debut as a child actor in this film (credited as Sujatha, her birth name)

Cast

Development 
Jamuna's character in the film, Rani Malini Devi was inspired by Ingrid Bergman's character in the 1964 film The Visit.

Music 
The music was composed by S. P. Kodandapani. The song "Babu Vinara" is quite popular.

Box office 
Pandanti Kapuram was the biggest hit of the year 1972. It is also the first film of Krishna to celebrate a silver jubilee run at the box office. The film completed a 100-day run in 21 centres (direct-19, shift-2).

Awards
National Film Awards
National Film Award for Best Feature Film in Telugu - 1972

Filmfare Awards South
Filmfare Best Film Award (Telugu) (1972)
 Filmfare Special Commendation Award - Jamuna

References

External links
 

1972 films
1970s Telugu-language films
Indian drama films
Telugu films remade in other languages
Best Telugu Feature Film National Film Award winners
Films directed by Lakshmi Deepak